Stefano Grandi (born 11 November 1962) is an Italian freestyle swimmer. He competed in two events at the 1984 Summer Olympics.

References

External links
 

1962 births
Living people
Italian male freestyle swimmers
Olympic swimmers of Italy
Swimmers at the 1984 Summer Olympics
Swimmers from Rome